Jet2holidays is a British package holiday provider and tour operator. It was formed in 2007 as a subsidiary of Dart Group PLC (now renamed Jet2 PLC), and a sister to Jet2.com, the third-largest scheduled airline in the UK.  As of 2023 Jet2holidays is the largest tour operator in the United Kingdom, by ATOL licenses in 2023

History
Jet2holidays was founded in June 2007. Upon launch, Jet2holidays provided package holidays from Jet2.com’s six bases in Leeds, Manchester, Belfast, Newcastle, Blackpool and Edinburgh. It began operations at East Midlands Airport in May 2010 and announced an expansion to Glasgow Airport later that year. In 2014, Blackpool Airport closed, taking the company back down to seven bases. 

By March 2015, Jet2holidays was providing package holidays to one million customers per year. The following month, it created Jet2CityBreaks, a subsidiary specialising in shorter holidays to its city destinations.

In April 2017, Jet2holidays became available from nine bases after the company announced an expansion to Birmingham Airport and London Stansted Airport. On 7 June 2017, Jet2holidays launched Jet2Villas, expanding its portfolio of self-catered package holidays. Later that month, it celebrated ten years of operation, and had sold over seven million package holidays.

In October 2017, when Monarch Airlines ceased operations, Jet2.com and Jet2holidays added over 650,000 seats from former Monarch airports, leading to Jet2holidays overtaking Thomas Cook Tour Operations to become the second-largest tour operator in the UK.

In February 2023 Jet2holidays added an extra 500,000 to its operating license  making it the largest tour operator in the UK. This now means it overtakes TUI UK as it will carry 5.8 million passengers in 2023.

Operations
Jet2holidays offers ABTA and ATOL-protected package holidays that comprise accommodation, transfers, baggage and return Jet2.com flights to 55 destinations, focusing on the Canary Islands, Balearic Islands, Spain, Greece and Turkey.

Jet2Villas provides self-catering villas and apartments across Jet2holidays destinations on a similar basis, while Jet2CityBreaks provides ABTA and ATOL-protected holidays with accommodation, baggage and flights to 37 destinations, including a seasonal service to New York, its sole transatlantic route.

Jet2holidays sells its products through both its website and independent travel agents. In 2010, TUI Group and Thomas Cook offered Jet2holidays deals through their own travel agent networks. As Jet2holidays grew to become the third-largest tour operator in the UK, both competitors ended these arrangements in 2017.

By January 2019, Jet2holidays was partnered with 1,000 travel agents, which were accountable for 25% of its overall bookings.

Awards

 2018, 2019: Best Short Haul Operator, Travel Weekly Globe Travel Awards.
 2018, 2019: Gold Trusted Service Award, Feefo Trusted Service Awards.
 2018: Travel Brand of the Year, Which? Awards.
 2017: highest-performing tourism organisation, Institute of Customer Service UK Customer Satisfaction Index

Fraudulent illness claims
In November 2018, Jet2holidays successfully defended itself against four holidaymakers who falsely claimed to suffer gastric illness on a holiday in Benidorm. All four were given a three-month prison sentence suspended for two years, and fines of £750 each. In December 2018, Jet2holidays fought a false compensation claim from two holidaymakers who travelled to Marmaris, Turkey, which resulted in the couple being forced to pay the company £30,000 in damages.

See also
 Jet2.com

References

External links

 Jet2holidays website
 Jet2.com website
 Dart Group website

Companies based in Leeds
British companies established in 2007
Travel and holiday companies of the United Kingdom